Jayasoorya Abhiram (born 30 August 1959) is an Indian former cricketer. He played as a right-handed batsman who bowled right-arm medium-fast. He made his debut in first-class cricket in the Ranji Trophy on 13 December 1979 for Karnataka against Hyderabad. He played 46 first-class and six list A matches.

Abhiram is married to the granddaughter of Neelam Sanjiva Reddy, the former President of India.

References

External links

Living people
1959 births
Indian cricketers
Karnataka cricketers
Cricketers from Bangalore